The Aerospace Industries Association (AIA) is an American trade association representing manufacturers and suppliers of civil, military, and business aircraft, helicopters, UAVs, space systems, aircraft engines, missiles, material, and related components, equipment, services, and information technology in the United States.  It also co-sponsors, with the National Association of Rocketry, the America Rocketry Challenge (TARC), an annual competition for high school students.  Member companies also give awards and scholarships to top placing teams at the TARC national finals each year, and it is funded through sponsoring companies. AIA also develops the manufacturing standards called National Aerospace Standards, which are available to aerospace manufacturers that conform to United States Military Standard's for equipment manufacturing and provide standards for other various components.

The organization's current president and CEO is Eric Fanning.

Organization

The Aerospace Industries Association (AIA) is governed by a board of governors that meets twice a year and consists of senior representatives of member companies at the c-suite level, and an executive committee that meets more frequently. The government frequently seeks advice from AIA on issues, and AIA provides a forum for government and industry representatives to exchange views and resolve problems on non-competitive matters related to aerospace and defense.

Advocacy

Founded in 1919 with the purpose of representing the American aviation industry, AIA has since expanded the scope of that vision with technological advance in aerospace. Today, on behalf of its more than 340 member companies, AIA advocates for aerospace and defense issues ranging from technical workforce policy to space exploration. Notable recurring topics of advocacy include "...robust federal budgets for aerospace and defense, a strong U.S. industrial base, defense modernization, and an efficient acquisition system."

Another AIA advocacy endeavor is National Aerospace Week, an event that celebrates aerospace in the United States. In 2010, National Aerospace Week was established under a resolution passed by both houses of the U.S. Congress, in conjunction with AIA. This event has been recognized by NASA and the U.S. Department of Commerce.

In late 2011, AIA launched the Second to None federal budget education campaign to inform the public and elected officials about the importance of the aerospace and defense industry and provide answers to what the predicted impacts of federal budget cuts, commonly known as sequestration, will have on the aerospace and defense industry. The campaign received significant media attention in 2012 for its efforts and competed as a finalist in 2012 for PRWeek Awards 2013's Public Affairs Campaign of the Year.

The America Rocketry Challenge

The America Rocketry Challenge (TARC) is an annual American model rocketry competition for students in grades seven to 12 sponsored by the Aerospace Industries Association and the National Association of Rocketry.  Co-sponsors include NASA, United States Department of Defense, the American Association of Physics Teachers and the Civil Air Patrol. The event receives local and national media coverage and draws well-known representatives of the Defense Department, NASA, the FAA, and other government agencies. Past National Fly-Offs have been attended by United States Secretary of Defense Robert Gates, Apollo 11 astronaut Buzz Aldrin, Rocket Boys author Homer Hickam, former NASA Administrator Sean O'Keefe, U.S. Senator Mike Enzi, and former NASA Administrator, Charles Bolden.

Membership

In October 2017, AIA's membership was composed of 346 member companies. This diverse group of businesses includes large aerospace and defense companies and small businesses alike. Membership is divided into full and associate membership.

One of AIA's key membership sources is its Supplier Management Council (SMC). The SMC is a unique, non-attributional forum where senior supply chain representatives from system integrators and manufacturers tackle issues that impact the aerospace and defense supply chain. Open to both Full Members and Associate Members, the Council's mission is to integrate and focus the collective capabilities of the supply chain, at every level, to influence the strategies, policies, and regulations that enable the U.S. aerospace and defense industry to successfully compete in the global market, be profitable, and strengthen the U.S. position as the world leader.

The American aerospace industry 
The US aerospace industry contributed $147 billion in export sales to the economy in 2016. This industry supported almost 1.7 million jobs in 2015. Aerospace manufacturing has two major segments, namely the commercial and the defense. The commercial segment constitutes roughly 60% of the industry. The defense segment caters to US government agencies, such as the Department of Defense (DOD) and the National Aerospace and Space Administration (NASA).

The Aircraft Year Book
The Aircraft Year Book (1919-1957), Aerospace-Facts-and-Figures (1959-1996), Annual-Report-Of-The-President (1952-1996), and other research documents have been uploaded and are online.

Aeronautical Chamber of Commerce 
"The Aeronautical Chamber of Commerce was incorporated under the laws of the State of New York in 1919 and was formally organized with 100 charter members on December 31, 1921."

Historical leadership

Previous chairman 
AIA Chairman are selected from the leadership of member companies, as voted by the Board of Governors. Each Chairman serves a yearlong term, begin on 1 January and ending on 31 December.

See also
The America Rocketry Challenge
National Aerospace Week

References

External links

AIA website

Aviation trade associations
Trade associations based in the United States
Organizations based in Arlington County, Virginia